Archibald Millar Robertson Sim (born 8 January 1942) is a former South African cricketer.  Sim was a right-handed batsman who bowled right-arm medium pace.  He was born at Johannesburg, Transvaal Province.

Sim made his first-class debut for North Eastern Transvaal against Rhodesia in the 1962/63 Currie Cup.  He made two further appearances in that season's competition, against Border and Rhodesia.  In his three appearances, he scored 45 runs at an average of 9.00, with a high score of 17.  He played county cricket for Northamptonshire in 1964, making his first-class debut for the county against Cambridge University.  He made a further appearance in 1965 against Oxford University, before making two further appearances in 1966 against Oxford University and Nottinghamshire.  In his four first-class appearances for Northamptonshire, he scored 151 runs at an average of 25.16, with a high score of 66 not out, which came against Oxford University in 1965.

References

External links
Archibald Sim at ESPNcricinfo
Archibald Sim at CricketArchive

1942 births
Living people
Cricketers from Johannesburg
South African cricketers
Northerns cricketers
Northamptonshire cricketers